Sahitya literally means literature in Sanskrit. It is also used to refer to the lyrics of a Carnatic music composition or lyrics of any song.

External links
 Sahityam Wiki
 Telugu Sahityam

Carnatic music terminology
Indian literature